David Running Deer was a professional football player during the early years of the National Football League. During his two-year career, Dave played in 5 games with the Oorang Indians. He played in 2 games for the 1922 season and in 3 games for the 1923 season. He ended his professional career after the Indians disbanded in 1923.

References
 
 

20th-century Native Americans
Year of birth missing
Year of death missing
Native American sportspeople
Oorang Indians players